The foreign policy of the Joe Biden administration emphasizes repairing the U.S.'s alliances, which Biden says had been damaged under the Trump administration, and returning the U.S. to a "position of trusted leadership" among world democracies to counter challenges from Russia and China. As president, Biden has sought to strengthen the transatlantic alliance between the U.S. and Europe, and he recommitted the U.S. to the NATO alliance and collective security. Biden returned the U.S. to the Paris Climate Agreement and has taken other steps to combat climate change. His administration emphasizes international cooperation to combat the COVID-19 pandemic, as well as U.S. defenses against foreign-sponsored cyberattacks and cyberespionage.

Biden was the chairman or ranking member of the Senate Foreign Relations Committee for twelve years and was influential in foreign affairs during the Obama presidency.

Biden's main U.S. foreign policy advisors are Secretary of State Antony Blinken and Secretary of Defense Lloyd Austin.  Critics have praised his leadership of NATO allies in supporting Ukraine against Russia, but have faulted him in "failing to match ends and means" regarding defense budgets, trade, Middle East stability, and defense of human rights.

Appointments

Americas

Brazil

The two countries re-approached with the victory of the left-wing president, Luiz Inácio Lula da Silva, in the 2022 Brazilian general election.

Canada

Biden's first foreign leader call was with Canadian Prime Minister Justin Trudeau on January 22, 2021. The call followed Biden's announcement of the cancellation of the Keystone Pipeline. Biden explained that he was following through on a campaign promise and restoring a decision made by the former Obama administration while acknowledging that the decision will cause hardship to Canada. Issues discussed included the COVID-19 pandemic and economic recovery therein, climate change and environmental issues, NATO, indigenous issues, and other international relations. In her first briefing, White House Secretary Psaki noted focus on foreign relations would be with friends and allies of the United States saying: "I would expect his early calls will be with partners and allies. He feels it's important to rebuild those relationships."

Biden held his first bilateral meeting with Prime Minister Trudeau on February 23, 2021, virtually. Issues discussed were COVID-19, climate change, detention of the Two Michaels in China, the future of NORAD, systemic racism and gender equality.

USMCA & "Buy American" Campaign
Biden admitted that the USMCA negotiated by the Trump administration was "better than NAFTA"
In November 2021, Biden hosted the first "Three Amigos" meeting since 2016.  Trudeau accuses Biden's tax-credit proposal for union-made electric vehicles of breaking the USMCA rules.  Economic tensions arise from protectionist measures and trade incentives for American industry as part of Biden's "Buy American" campaign.

Haiti
Biden condemned the assassination of Haitian president Jovenel Moïse in 2021. He later announced that he would be sending troops to guard the embassy in Port-au-Prince. The Haitian government asked the US as well as the United Nations and Canada for more troops, but this was rejected.

Central America

Nicaragua

The Biden Administration has continued the American policy of support for Nicaraguan civil society groups, human rights, and free elections against a government accused of human rights violations, political suppression, and corruption. An extremely controversial attempt by longtime Nicaraguan Sandinista President Daniel Ortega to cut social benefits led to widespread protests and a crackdown against opposition politicians, protesters, and press condemned by an Inter-American Commission on Human Rights task force and the Organization of American States as involving crimes against humanity and violations of human rights.

The Administration has expressed "[deep] concern about the escalating crackdown" and called for Ortega to reverse course. In a June 22, 2021 United Nations Human Rights Council meeting, the United States joined 58 other countries to call for the release of jailed presidential candidates and dissidents and rehabilitation of Nicaraguan democracy. On July 12, 2021, the State Department imposed visa restrictions on 100 Nicaraguan legislature and judiciary accused of enabling "attacks on democracy and human rights" by Ortega and Murillo, Ortega's wife and Vice President. Biden's FY2022 budget request included $15 million of aid for Nicaragua, all of which will be directed towards democracy and rights programs. On August 6, 2021, the State Department placed visa restrictions on 50 immediate family members of Nicaraguan officials accused of benefiting from Ortega's regime; this came amidst an upcoming November 2021 election in which many opposition candidates have been arrested or barred from running.

Several bills proposed by the 117th Congress concern U.S. relations with Nicaragua, particularly with regards to Nicaraguan democracy and respect for human rights.

Northern Triangle

The Northern Triangle refers to the three Central American countries of Honduras, El Salvador, and Guatemala, usually in reference to the nations' poverty, political instability, and crime/violence as motivating factors of their residents' legal and illegal immigration to the United States.

Mexican President López Obrador said that President Biden has pledged $4 billion for development in Honduras, El Salvador, and Guatemala. Secretary of State Antony Blinken said on February 6 that agreements with those three countries to send asylum-seekers back to those countries until their cases were heard were suspended.

Vice President Kamala Harris visited Guatemala as part of her first foreign trip in office. In Guatemala City, Harris held a joint press conference with Guatemalan President Alejandro Giammattei where she issued an appeal to potential migrants, stating "I want to be clear to folks in the region who are thinking about making that dangerous trek to the United States-Mexico border: Do not come. Do not come."

Cuba

The Biden administration has kept the sanctions against Cuba that were issued by the previous presidential administration, despite one of Biden's campaign promises being to lift restrictions against the country.

In June 2021, the Biden administration continued America's tradition of voting against an annual United Nations General Assembly resolution calling for an end to the U.S. economic embargo against Cuba. The resolution was adopted for the 29th time with 184 votes in favor, three abstentions, and two no votes: the U.S. and Israel.

In July 2021, protesters gathered in front of the White House and demonstrators called on President Joe Biden to take action in Cuba. The Biden administration sanctioned a key Cuban official and a government special forces unit known as the Boinas Negras for human rights abuses in the wake of historic protests on the island. On July 22, 2021, directly before hosting a meeting with Cuban American leaders, President Biden stated "I unequivocally condemn the mass detentions and sham trials that are unjustly sentencing to prison those who dared to speak out in an effort to intimidate and threaten the Cuban people into silence." President Biden has also ordered government specialists to develop ideas for the U.S. to unilaterally extend internet access on the island, and he has promised to enhance backing for Cuban dissidents.

In August 2021, Biden sanctioned three additional Cuban officials who were also reportedly involved in the suppression of anti-government protesters in Cuba.

In December 2021, 114 Democratic House members signed a letter that urged President Biden to lift restrictions and sanctions against Cuba in order to make their access to food and medicine easier.

In January 2022, Biden again sanctioned Cuba officials, this time placing travel restrictions on eight members of the Cuban government.

In May 2022, the Biden Administration lifted some of the sanctions, with policy changes such as expansion of flights to Cuba and resumption of a family reunification program. In January 2023, the Biden administration made changes to its immigration policy, to limit the amount of Cuban migrants entering the United States.

Mexico

Biden had a call with Mexican President Andrés Manuel López Obrador on January 22, 2021. On the call they spoke of issues such as regionality and regional migration, reducing immigration across the Mexico–U.S. border by targeting the root cause, increasing resettlement capacity, providing legal alternatives for immigration pathways, improving the treatment of immigrants at the border, adequate arbitration of requests for asylum, reversal of the Trump administration's immigration policies, and the COVID-19 pandemic. Obrador said the call was "pleasant and respectful" and that relations between Mexico and the U.S. would improve in the future.

Biden held his bilateral meeting with President Obrador on March 1, 2021, virtually.

Venezuela

With respect to the crisis in Venezuela, Biden retained a hard-line approach, continuing to recognize opposition leader Juan Guaidó as the legitimate president of Venezuela and declining to directly negotiate with President Nicolás Maduro. The U.S. State Department emphasized that "Maduro is a dictator" and that the regime's repression and corruption created a humanitarian catastrophe. The administration indicated that it would not rush to lift U.S. sanctions on Venezuela, but would consider easing sanctions if Maduro takes took "serious steps" to negotiate seriously with the opposition. The administration continued support for humanitarian aid to Venezuela. In early March 2021, the administration granted Temporary Protected Status for an 18-month period to Venezuelans who were already living in the U.S., having fled the Maduro regime due to the country's economic collapse and repression.

Europe

European Union
Some analysts and diplomats say the proposed Comprehensive Agreement on Investment between China and the European Union may damage relations with the United States as the EU hands China a political win at the expense of incoming president Biden. In December 2020, Jake Sullivan, Biden's national security adviser, said he would welcome "early consultation" with Europe on China. However, instead of holding off for Biden to take office to devise a common approach toward China, the EU agreed to the deal anyway.

In the calls with the European leaders, President Biden spoke of bilateral relations, bolstering transatlantic relations through NATO and the European Union, and closely coordinating on key issues, such as Iran, China, Russia, Afghanistan, climate change, the COVID-19 pandemic and multilateral organizations.

President Biden promised to repair "strained" relationships with European allies in contrast to his predecessor Trump. At the Munich Security Conference, Biden warned that "Putin seeks to weaken the European project and our NATO alliance." Biden called for multilateralism to strengthen the defensive position and economic power of the transatlantic alliance, and solve global problems like the COVID pandemic and climate change.

France

On January 24, 2021, Biden and French President Emmanuel Macron had a phone call.

In September 2021, the French ambassador was recalled to Paris after the AUKUS security pact had been made by Australia, the U.K. and the U.S. The measure was unprecedented; in almost 250 years of diplomatic relations, France had never before recalled its U.S. ambassadorship. The Biden administration tried to placate French anger.

In October 2021, Biden met with Macron and admitted that his administration was "clumsy" in its handling of the nuclear submarine deal with Australia, which deprived France of billions in defense contracts.

Germany

On January 25, 2021, Biden and German Chancellor Angela Merkel had a phone call.

In early February 2021, Biden froze the Trump administration's withdrawal of 9,500 troops from U.S. military bases in Germany, Biden's freeze was welcomed by Germany, which said that the move "serves European and transatlantic security and hence is in our mutual interest."

Greece and Cyprus

Antony Blinken indicated American interest in robust ties between itself, Greece, Israel, and Cyprus, in response to questioning by Senate Foreign Relations Committee chair Bob Menendez regarding the Eastern Mediterranean Security and Energy Partnership Act.
On 13 October 2021, Greece and the US upgraded their defense pact, signing an agreement that allows expanded access for US troops to train and operate from four additional bases in Greece indefinitely. Greece also has a bilateral maritime defense pact with France, and the parties hold these pacts to be complementary to NATO.

Ireland

On March 17, 2021, St. Patrick's Day, Biden continued tradition by meeting with Irish Taoiseach Micheál Martin, though this time virtually due to the pandemic. They discussed COVID-19, security issues and Northern Ireland as Biden emphasized his support for the Good Friday Agreement. In an interview with MSNBC, Martin said that "In President Biden, we have perhaps the most Irish American president since John F. Kennedy, and his election was greeted with great affection and warmth".

Kosovo and Serbia

In February 2021, Biden sent letters to Kosovo's acting President Vjosa Osmani and Serbian President Aleksandar Vučić, urging the normalization of Kosovo–Serbia relations based on "mutual recognition" and expressing support for economic normalization agreements; Biden's engagement with the issue signaled a new U.S. focus on European security. Biden has said recognition of Kosovo is necessary for normalization of Serbia–U.S. relations.

Poland 

President Biden visited Poland on March 25–26, 2022. He held talks with Polish leaders and met Ukrainian refugees. He also made a speech in the courtyard of Royal Castle in Warsaw. He referred to the historical experiences of Poland, the Russian-Ukrainian war and the aggressive policy of Russia. The purpose of Biden's trip to Poland was to express NATO's unity and the US commitment to defend its allies.

Russia

Through 2020, Biden and Putin had met once, in Moscow in March 2011, when Biden was vice president and Putin was prime minister. After an official group meeting Biden characterized in his memoir as "argumentative," he and Putin met privately, with Biden saying "Mr. Prime Minister, I'm looking into your eyes," (a reference to a 2001 meeting between Putin and President Bush, who later said "I looked the man in the eye...I was able to get a sense of his soul"). Biden continued, "I don't think you have a soul." Putin replied, "We understand each other."

As vice president, Biden had urged the Ukrainian government to eliminate middlemen such as oligarch Dmytry Firtash from the country's natural gas industry, and to reduce the country's reliance on imports of Russian natural gas. Firtash has said he was installed as a middleman by Russian organized crime boss Semion Mogilevich; Putin agreed with the appointment. Since 2014, Firtash has been fighting extradition to the U.S. under a federal indictment. He was involved in efforts by Rudy Giuliani and his associates in seeking information that might damage Biden's 2020 presidential prospects.

The United States intelligence community found that Russian intelligence actors have been spreading narratives of alleged corruption about Biden, his family and Ukraine since at least 2014.

On the day of Biden's inauguration, the Russian government urged the new U.S. administration to take a "more constructive" approach in talks over the extension of the 2010 New START treaty, the sole remaining agreement limiting the number of U.S. and Russian long-range nuclear warheads. In Biden's first telephone call as president with Russian President Vladimir Putin, on January 26, 2021, Biden and Putin agreed to extend the New START treaty (which was set to expire in February 2021) by an additional five years.

Biden and his administration condemned human rights violations by the Russian authorities, calling for the release of detained dissident and anti-corruption activist Alexei Navalny, his wife, and the thousands of Russians who had demonstrated in his support; the U.S. called for the unconditional release of Navalny and the protestors and a credible investigation into Navalny's poisoning. On March 2, 2021, the U.S. and European Union imposed coordinated additional sanctions on Russian officials, as well as the FSB and GRU, over the Navalny poisoning and imprisonment. The State Department also expanded existing sanctions from the Chemical and Biological Weapons Control and Warfare Elimination Act that had been imposed after the poisoning of Skripal.

The Biden administration is also planning to impose sanctions against Russia over the 2020 SolarWinds cyberespionage campaign, which compromised the computer systems of nine federal agencies. Biden's national security adviser Jake Sullivan said that the response "will include a mix of tools seen and unseen, and it will not simply be sanctions."

The Biden administration's comprehensive review into Russian activities has included an examination of reports that the Russian government offered to Taliban-linked fighters to kill U.S. troops in Afghanistan.

On March 16, 2021, a DNI report on the 2020 U.S. federal elections was declassified. It had confirmed that both the governments of Russia and Iran had been attempting to influence the 2020 United States elections, with Putin approving the operation of influencing the elections. Although no evidence was found of any votes, ballots, or registrations being directly changed by foreign actors, the assessment did find that Russian efforts were aimed at  "denigrating President Biden's candidacy and the Democratic Party, supporting former President Trump, undermining public confidence in the electoral process, and exacerbating sociopolitical divisions in the US". On the following day, Biden commented on the new information in an interview with ABC News that Putin will "pay a price", also labeling Putin a "killer".

Meeting with NATO allies in Brussels two days before his scheduled June 2021 summit with Russian president Vladimir Putin, Biden refuted an assertion by Ukrainian president Volodymyr Zelenskyy that NATO had agreed to admit Ukraine to the alliance. Ukrainian allegiance has been a persistently contentious issue between Russia and the United States.

Speaking to American military personnel in Britain en route to the summit, Biden said, "We're not seeking conflict with Russia. We want a stable predictable relationship. I've been clear: the United States will respond in a robust and meaningful way if the Russian government engages in harmful activities." He added he would "meet with Mr. Putin to let him know what I want him to know."

Following the meeting, Biden stated to reporters that he warned Putin that the U.S. would use offensive cyber operations if Russia did not crack down on cyberattacks against "critical infrastructure."

In May 2021, the Biden administration waived sanctions against the Russian-owned Nord Stream 2 pipeline. In August 2021, the Biden administration imposed new specific sanctions on a Russian ship (Ostap Sheremeta) and two companies involved in the Nord Stream 2, while issuing an executive order that would allow for sanctions to be imposed on certain pipelines.

The 2021–2022 crisis between Russia and Ukraine, which involved Russian troops build up along the border, resulted in renewed tensions between Russia and NATO. On December 30, 2021, Biden and Putin discussed the crisis over the course of a 50-minute phone call. Bilateral talks began in Geneva on January 10, 2022, to discuss concerns about Ukraine and Russia's concern of NATO postering in Eastern Europe. The talks were be led by U.S. Deputy Secretary of State, Wendy Sherman. Biden warned of a "distinct possibility" Russia would invade Ukraine. One week before the invasion, Biden said there was a "very high" risk Russia would invade, and Blinken spoke at a United Nations Security Council meeting, saying he wants to prevent a war, which he believed would start with a manufactured pretext for Russia to invade.

Following the Russian invasion of Ukraine, Biden condemned Putin, calling him "the aggressor" and announcing additional sanctions on Russia. On February 25, the White House announced the US would personally sanction Putin and foreign minister Sergey Lavrov. Sanctions on Putin's inner circle were increased in multiple rounds over the following months. On February 28, the Biden administration announced sanctions against Russia's central bank, prohibiting Americans from doing business with the bank and freezing the bank's assets. Additional sets of sanctions included a ban on Russian oil and gas imports. On April 6, 2022, the White House said that the US, alongside the G7 and EU, had imposed "the most impactful, coordinated, and wide-ranging economic restrictions in history" and that day announced new sanctions in response to the Bucha massacre. In May, the rest of the G7 also committed to a phase out of Russian oil. The United States blocked various Russian bank entities.

Ukraine

Biden pledged support for the sovereignty of Ukraine.

Biden opposed the Nord Stream 2 pipeline, describing it as a "bad deal for Europe". The pipeline project was criticized for the leverage it would have given to Russia in isolating Ukraine, In 2021, a joint statement of the Ukrainian and Polish governments urged Biden to take more decisive action against Nord Stream 2. During the 2021–2022 Russo-Ukrainian crisis, Biden imposed sanctions on Nord Stream 2 in retaliation against Russian troop build ups in February 2022.

Previously in March 2021, the Biden administration announced a $125 million military aid package to Ukraine, including Mark VI patrol boats, radars and medical equipment. On September 1, 2021, President Joe Biden and Ukrainian President Volodymyr Zelenskyy met in the White House and discussed Euro-Atlantic cooperation. Various agreements were announced by the Biden administration. An additional $60 million in US aid to Ukraine was announced, bringing the yearly total to over $400 million. Ukraine and the U.S. made a joint statement on strategic cooperation.  President Biden stated, "We're revitalizing the Strategic Partnership Commission between our nations." and promised to continue to provide COVID-19 vaccines to Ukraine following the 2.5 million sent. The joint statement includes points such as "The United States and Ukraine continue to oppose Nord Stream 2, which we view as a threat to European energy security," endorsed the Normandy Format, and announced cooperation on cybersecurity, satellite awareness and R&D.

Following the Russian invasion of Ukraine in February 2022, Biden supported defensive and humanitarian aid to Ukraine. In March 2022, Biden supported the international response against Russia and pledged to accept 100,000 Ukrainian refugees. In May, he signed the Ukraine Democracy Defense Lend-Lease Act of 2022 and a $40 billion aid package for Ukraine. From July, the Biden administration supplied HIMARS to Ukraine. On August 1, the State Department announced $550 million in security aid to Ukraine focused on supplies for HIMARS systems.

United Kingdom

On January 23, 2021, Biden and the British Prime Minister Boris Johnson had a phone call. With the U.K. assuming control over its trade policy after the completion of Brexit and the withdrawal from the European Economic Area, Johnson pushed Biden for a new trade deal that would unite a global response to the COVID-19 pandemic. The Biden administration signaled that it is unlikely to push for a U.K.-U.S. free trade agreement (a major priority for Johnson) early on in Biden's term, as Biden has expressed a desire for the U.S. to make "major investments in American workers and our infrastructure" before entered into new free trade agreements.

On June 13, 2021, Joe and Jill Biden met with Queen Elizabeth II at Windsor Castle while on their visit to the U.K. for the G7 Summit. The visit included a Guard of Honour and afternoon tea with the Queen. After the meeting, Biden said that the Queen was "very generous" and he told reporters that "she reminded me of my mother". Biden also revealed that during their meeting, the Queen asked about Vladimir Putin and Xi Jinping.

New Atlantic Charter
On June 10, 2021, Biden and British Prime Minister Boris Johnson issued the New Atlantic Charter while in Cornwall, England. The Charter has been described as a "revitalized" version of the original Atlantic Charter which was signed by President Franklin D. Roosevelt and Prime Minister Winston Churchill eighty years prior. A statement issued by the White House described the New Atlantic Charter as aimed to meet the "new challenges of the 21st century," while also "building on the commitments and aspirations set out eighty years ago."

Northern Ireland
Biden has routinely iterated his commitment to maintaining peace in Northern Ireland by resisting the possibility of a hard border as a result of Brexit. When asked by The Irish Times in March 2021 about comments made by Irish foreign minister Simon Coveney that the U.K. "cannot be trusted" on the Northern Ireland protocol, White House press secretary Jen Psaki stated that "President Biden has been unequivocal about his support for the Good Friday Agreement". As part of his own Irish-American heritage, Psaki stated that Biden "has a special place in his heart for the Irish" underpinning his commitment to Northern Ireland's peace.

Middle East
Biden has been a proponent of his "counterterrorism plus" strategy in the Middle East, which he says will end previous discriminatory counterterrorism policies in the region by "creating a dialogue with Arab American community leaders on issues of surveillance, policing, and counterterrorism, in tandem with other communities historically affected by securitized relationships with the U.S. government." Biden told the Council on Foreign Relations that his foreign policy will destroy al-Qaeda and Islamic State, ensuring their remnants will not reconstitute themselves.

On the day Biden took office, the new administration adopted tighter controls on drone strikes and special forces raids in places where there are few U.S. troops, including Libya and Yemen. The policy halted the Trump-era policy that gave U.S. military officials more discretion to launch counterterrorism attacks without White House oversight. The temporary measure was put in place while the Biden administration completes an interagency review into the drone policy. The review focuses on whether to restore a 2016 order issued by Obama (revoked in 2019 by Trump) that would require the government to issue an annual report disclosing estimates of the numbers of suspected terrorists and civilian casualties, and whether to return to the Obama-era centralized oversight system (in which proposed drone strikes could be approved only if the suspect presented a "continuing and imminent threat" to Americans, and were subject to high-level intelligence vetting in an effort to minimize civilian casualties and blowback) or to keep elements of the Trump-era approach (which was looser and delegated more power to the military and CIA to determine whether to carry out a strike).

Caucasus
On April 24, 2021, on Armenian Genocide Remembrance Day, Biden made a statement recognizing the Armenian genocide as a genocide after he indicated support for the congressional recognition of the Armenian Genocide. The move angered Turkey, which does not recognize the World War I-era systematic slaughter of Armenians by the Ottoman Empire as genocide and seeks to persuade other nations to do the same.

As designate, Secretary of State Blinken reaffirmed his support for keeping NATO's door open for Georgia.

On November 18, 2021, the U.S. State Department praised the independent medical team that criticized the prison hospital conditions that Mikheil Saakashvili was placed in, and urged the Georgian government to treat Saakashvili "fairly and with dignity" and guarantee his right to a fair trial.

Iran

Biden criticized Trump's approach to Iran as "a self-inflicted disaster," citing his withdrawal of the U.S. from the international nuclear agreement with Iran and escalation of tensions in 2020. In early February 2021, Biden indicated that the U.S. would not lift sanctions on Iran until that country stopped enriching uranium. A few weeks later, Biden formally extended an offer to restart diplomatic talks on a new nuclear deal. Talks started shortly after that and continued until March 2022 when Iran had additional demands such as delisting the Islamic Revolutionary Guards Corps from the US FTO designation  list which led to talks being stalled.

Israel and Palestine conflict

Biden has been a firm supporter of Israel-United States relations, describing himself a Zionist and stating that U.S. aid to Israel is an investment. Biden's UN Ambassador-designate Linda Thomas-Greenfield vowed to "stand against the unfair singling out of Israel for Boycott, Divestment, and Sanctions, saying that the movement "verges on antisemitism."

During his Senate confirmation hearing, Secretary of State Antony Blinken said that the Biden administration would continue to recognize Jerusalem as the capital of Israel and to keep the U.S. embassy in Jerusalem which had been relocated from its previous site in Tel Aviv by the Trump Administration per the 1995 Jerusalem Embassy Act, passed by a bipartisan supermajority. Biden called Trump's move, done without conditions, "short-sighted and frivolous" but said during his campaign that he would keep the embassy in Jerusalem and not move it back to Tel Aviv. In February 2021, the U.S. Senate adopted, by a 97–3 vote, an amendment to a budget resolution that affirmed the U.S. intent to keep the embassy in Jerusalem.

Consistent with Biden's statements during the campaign, upon taking office, the Biden administration returned the U.S. to a "more traditional and evenhanded approach to the Israeli-Palestinian conflict." Biden's acting U.S. ambassador to the UN reaffirmed that the U.S. supported a negotiated two-state solution "in which Israel lives in peace and security, alongside a viable Palestinian state" and called upon the parties to refrain from taking steps that could inhibit a two-state solution, such as Israel annexing or expanding settlements in the West Bank, or the Palestinians inciting violence. The administration restored U.S. diplomatic relations with the Palestinian Authority and resumed U.S. aid to the Palestinians, two years after Trump had effectively ended U.S. engagement with the Palestinians.

Biden's first call as president with a Middle Eastern leader was with Israeli Prime Minister Benjamin Netanyahu in mid-February 2021; on the call, Biden reaffirmed U.S. support for Israeli security, for the recent normalization of relations between Israel and a handful of Arab and Muslim nations, and for the Israeli–Palestinian peace process, and the two leaders discussed cooperation against threats from Iran. On April 7, 2021, the Biden administration announced its intention to restore hundreds of millions of dollars in U.S. aid to the Palestinians.

Blinken attended the Negev Summit on 27 March 2022 hosted by foreign minister Yair Lapid of Israel and counterparts from Morocco, UAE, Bahrain, and Egypt. In July 2022, it was announced by the White House that Biden would travel to the Middle East and meet with the leaders of Israel, the Palestinian Authority, and Saudi Arabia.

Jordan

During a July 19, 2021 meeting at the White House with Jordanian King Abdullah II and Crown Prince Hussein, Biden expressed "strong U.S. support for Jordan," a longtime U.S. partner in the Middle East, pushed for improving Israel–Jordan relations, and supported military cooperation between Jordan and the U.S. He and King Abdullah II also discussed Jordan's economic future and the American donation of 500,000 COVID-19 vaccines to the Kingdom. The Biden Administration has continued to provide military and economic aid to Jordan, whose struggling economy has been damaged by the COVID-19 pandemic.

North Africa

The U.S. called for Russian, Turkish, and UAE forces (and their proxies) to immediately withdraw from Libya,  after those countries ignored the January 23, 2021 deadline for foreign forces and mercenaries to leave the country (as set by a UN-backed ceasefire signed in October 2019 to end the war among the countries' factions and their foreign supporters). Richard M. Mills Jr., the Acting U.S. Ambassador to the UN, said, "We call on all external parties, to include Russia, Turkey and the UAE, to respect Libyan sovereignty and immediately cease all military intervention in Libya."

The Biden administration pressed the Egyptian government of Abdel Fattah el-Sisi to improve its poor human rights record, but nonetheless approved in February 2021 a $197 million sale of Rolling Airframe Missiles for the Egyptian Navy's coastal defenses, citing the country's role in regional security as a major non-NATO ally.

Saudi Arabia, Yemen, and the Persian Gulf states

On January 27, 2021, the day after Antony Blinken took office as Secretary of State, the Biden administration put a temporary freeze on arms sales to Saudi Arabia (specifically, of precision-guided munitions) and the United Arab Emirates (specifically, of F-35 fighter jets) pending a review of billions of dollars' worth of weapons transactions approved by the Trump administration.

In February 2021, shortly after taking office, Biden fulfilled a campaign pledge to end U.S. support for the five-year Saudi Arabian–led offensive in Yemen. The Saudi offensive caused a humanitarian crisis in Yemen (the poorest country in the Arabian Peninsula) and failed to defeat the Iran-backed Houthis. Biden called for the warring parties to adopt a cease-fire, open channels to allow the delivery of humanitarian aid, and resume the Yemeni peace process. Shortly thereafter, the Biden administration also removed the Houthis from the State Department list of foreign terrorist organizations, a designation that the Trump administration had made in its final days in office. The designation had threatened to halt the delivery of food and humanitarian aid to Yemenis. The Biden administration made clear that the U.S. would continue to defend Saudi Arabia against Houthi attacks, continue U.S. cooperation with the Saudi government on military and counterterrorism issues, and continue U.S. efforts against al-Qaida in the Arabian Peninsula.

Biden chose to deal directly with King Salman, bypassing the young Crown Prince Mohammed bin Salman (MBS), the de facto Saudi leader, whose standing in Washington was seriously damaged by the assassination of dissident and journalist Jamal Khashoggi, his jailing of Saudi dissidents, and his role in the Yemeni war. The administration announced that it would not deal with MBS in any capacity except Saudi defense minister, the position he holds in addition to being crown prince and designated heir. In an attempt to repair the kingdom's image to a deeply skeptical new administration, the Saudi government undertook certain reforms in early 2021 that the U.S. had urged, including releasing imprisoned activist Loujain al-Hathloul and some other political prisoners, beginning judicial reforms, and revising state-approved school textbooks to eliminate certain material that promoted Islamic extremism, radicalization, and anti-Semitism. In February 2021, the Biden administration publicly released a report (long withheld by the Trump administration) by the Office of the Director of National Intelligence, containing U.S. intelligence's assessment that MBS had approved the Saudi operation that led to Khashoggi's brutal murder in October 2018, basing this conclusion on "the Crown Prince's control of decisionmaking in the Kingdom, the direct involvement of a key adviser and members of Muhammad bin Salman's protective detail in the operation, and the Crown Prince's support for using violent measures to silence dissidents abroad, including Khashoggi."

After the report was released, the administration announced a new "Khashoggi ban" policy, allowing the U.S. government to bar visas for persons working for a foreign government that are directly engaged in "serious, extraterritorial counter-dissident activities, including those that suppress, harass, surveil, threaten, or harm journalists, activists, or other persons perceived to be dissidents for their work." The travel ban was imposed against 76 Saudi citizens, including Ahmad Asiri, the ex-Saudi intelligence chief who helped orchestrate the Khashoggi operation, and on the Saudi Royal Guard's Rapid Intervention Force, the MBS bodyguard unit under the crown prince's personal control. Despite pressure from human rights groups and some Democrats to do so, the administration did not impose any direct sanctions on MBS personally, determining that the damage to Saudi–U.S. relations would be too grave. Administration officials announced that it intended to use the "Khashoggi ban" policy against officials in other countries, such as Russia, China, and Turkey, that have attempted to silence critics living in the U.S., Europe, or other free nations.

Human rights groups have urged the Biden administration to prioritize the restoration of human rights in Bahrain as a key component of the U.S. foreign policy in the Middle East.

An administration source cited that they were preparing an overhaul of arms export policy, aimed at gaining balance between American defense contractors and commitment to human rights. The new policy is said to affect arms sales to countries accused of human rights violations. Major arms sales like the $23 billion arms deal with the UAE also remained in limbo following the new shift in the policy, as progressives in the President's party are against the sale due to Emirates' role in the Yemeni Civil War.

Syria

On February 15, 2021, an Iranian-backed militia launched a missile attack on the airport in Erbil in northern Iraq, killing a Filipino contractor with the U.S.-led military coalition and wounded six others, including five Americans. In retaliation, Biden ordered an airstrike on the Iranian-backed Kataib Hezbollah (KH) and Kataib Sayyid al-Shuhada (KSS) militias in eastern Syria, just across the border with Iraq (between Al Qaem and Abu Kamal). This was the administration's first military action. Pentagon spokesperson John Kirby described the American retaliation as a proportionate response meant to punish the perpetrators but not to escalate hostilities with Iran. Biden called off a second planned strike at the last minute after military reconnaissance identified civilians in the intended target.

On June 27, 2021, the U.S. carried out a round of airstrikes against three operational and arms storage facilities of Iran-backed militias in the Syria-Iraq border region. The Pentagon press secretary stated that the action was in response to UAV attacks by the militias.

On February 3, 2022, ISIS leader Abu Ibrahim al-Hashimi al-Qurashi killed himself during a counterterrorism operation by the U.S. Special Forces in Atme in northwest Syria.

Turkey

In his confirmation hearings, Blinken stated that "we are very clear eyed" about the problems posed by an expansionist Turkey and said that the Turkish government under Recep Tayyip Erdoğan was "not acting like an ally" and would review if sanctions were necessary against Erdoğan's government due to its purchase of Russian S-400 missile systems. Turkish–U.S. relations have been strained over Turkey's actions in Syria, its oil exploration in the eastern Mediterranean, and its role in the 2020 Nagorno-Karabakh war, as well as Turkey's demands (rejected by the U.S.) for the extradition of dissident preacher Fethullah Gülen.

Northeast Asia

China, Taiwan, and the South China Sea
Biden has criticized the government of the People's Republic of China (PRC) for being "deeply authoritarian", stealing "over 1 million" manufacturing jobs from Americans, breaking international trade regulations, unfairly subsidizing Chinese corporations, and stealing intellectual property from U.S. firms and discriminating against them. Tariffs imposed by Trump on the PRC will remain in place. Biden said he had spent more time in private meetings with Chinese Communist Party leader Xi Jinping than any other world leader. He has criticized Xi as "a guy who doesn't have a democratic bone in his body. This is a guy who is a thug." Janet Yellen said the administration would use the United States' "full array of tools" against "abusive" PRC practices. Antony Blinken, crediting the Trump administration's hawkish approach, characterized the PRC as a "techno-autocracy" which seeks world dominance. Blinken indicated a desire to welcome political refugees from Hong Kong. Furthermore, he stated that the Biden administration's commitment to Taiwan's defense would "absolutely endure", and that a PRC attack on Taiwan "would be a grievous mistake on their part". The representative of Taiwan in the United States Hsiao Bi-khim (the country's de facto ambassador) was invited to attend Biden's presidential inauguration, becoming the first Taiwanese representative to attend a U.S. presidential ceremony.

On January 20, 2021, around the time of the inauguration of Biden, the PRC government announced sanctions against Mike Pompeo and 27 other former officials who worked under the Trump presidency. A spokesperson for Biden's National Security Council called the sanctions "unproductive and cynical." This comes after Pompeo, who was Secretary of State under Donald Trump, formally declared that China is committing a genocide against the Uyghurs, which the Biden campaign had previously said half a year prior in a statement in August 2020. During his nomination hearing, Blinken endorsed Pompeo's report that China is committing a genocide against Uyghur Muslims, reaffirming the Biden's campaign stance.

The Biden administration took a tough stance on China, with Blinken and Director of National Intelligence Avril Haines advocating an assertive U.S. approach. The Biden administration rejected China's territorial and maritime claims in the South China Sea that violate international law and pledged to back Southeastern Asian nations on territorial disputes. The administration also condemned Chinese incursions into Taiwan's air defense zone. In February 2021, the administration called upon the Chinese government and the World Health Organization to release data about the origin of COVID-19; China had refused to grant WHO investigators access to the raw data on early cases of the virus. The British government backed Biden's call for transparency.

During his first visit to the Pentagon on February 9, 2021, Biden urged for the United States Department of Defense to "review" its national security policy concerning China. Biden held his first telephone call with Chinese leader Xi Jinping on February 10, 2021; during the call, Biden raised issues of "Beijing's coercive and unfair economic practices" as well as the government's "crackdown in Hong Kong, human rights abuses in Xinjiang, and increasingly assertive actions in the region, including toward Taiwan"; the conversation also involved the COVID-19 pandemic and "shared challenges of global health security, climate change and preventing weapons proliferation."

In late February 2021, Biden ordered the government to undertake a 100-day supply chain review, examining sourcing vulnerabilities for key components (such as semiconductors, rare earth minerals, and certain batteries) used in important goods (such as computers, electric vehicles, pharmaceuticals, personal protective equipment, and military equipment), including vulnerabilities from "strategic competitor nations." Biden stated that the review would assess how to avoid having the U.S. "rely on a foreign country, especially one that doesn't share our interests or our values, in order to protect and provide for our people during a national emergency." The review was part of a broader competition between the U.S. and China for global economic influence.

The first high-level talks between the Biden administration and China were held in Anchorage, Alaska on March 19, 2021. Participants included secretary of state Tony Blinken and national security advisor Jake Sullivan from the U.S. side, and the Chinese Communist Party Politburo member and highest-ranking diplomat Yang Jiechi and foreign minister Wang Yi from the Chinese side. The public meeting was contentious, with Blinken and Sullivan raising questions on China's human rights records, cyberattacks, its threats against Taiwan, its crackdown in Xinjiang and Hong Kong, and other issues of U.S. interest. Yang and Wang countered by saying that the U.S. "did not speak to China from a position of strength", "did not serve as a model to others", and that "China's rise was unstoppable". Yang further accused the U.S. of "inciting other countries to attack China" to which Sullivan responded by saying Washington would always support its allies. In the week ahead of the talks, the administration met with U.S. allies in Asia and imposed sanctions on senior Chinese officials.

In April 2021, it was reported that the Biden administration was rallying U.S. allies in consideration of a boycott of the 2022 Winter Olympics in Beijing. The U.S. Department of State denied the report, asserting that "Our position on the 2022 Olympics has not changed. We have not discussed and are not discussing any joint boycott with allies and partners".

Taiwan's peace and stability was mentioned in the leader level joint statement after Japanese Prime Minister Suga visited President Biden in April 2021.

At their annual meeting on June 13, 2021, leaders from the Group of Seven (G7) democracies sharply criticized China for a series of abuses. The G7 nations—the United States, United Kingdom, Germany, France, Italy, Canada and Japan—had been hesitant about acting separately. Pressured by Biden, they unanimously agreed on a sharp criticism, followed the next day by a similar strong unanimous attack by NATO members. The criticisms focused on the mistreatment of the Muslim Uighur minority, the systematic destruction of democracy in Hong Kong, repeated military threats against Taiwan, unfair trade practices, and lack of transparency regarding the origins of COVID-19. China has rejected all criticism of what it considers to be strictly internal policy matters. On the other hand, the constellation of critics is essential to the Chinese economy in terms of jobs, investments and purchases of its huge quantity of exports.

Biden held his second telephone call with Chinese leader Xi Jinping on September 9, 2021. On September 21, 2021, Biden urged the U.N. General Assembly to consider "relentless diplomacy" in amidst rising tensions between the U.S. and China. Without mentioning China by name, he said the U.S. is "not seeking a new Cold War or a world divided into rigid blocs." Meng Wanzhou returned to China on September 24.

On October 21, 2021, Biden said the U.S. would defend Taiwan if China attacked, though the White House said later there was no change in policy towards the island.

Biden held his first virtual meeting with Chinese Communist Party leader Xi Jinping on November 15, 2021.

In May 2022, the State Department updated its Taiwan fact sheet to reinstate a line saying “we do not support Taiwan independence.”

Some geoeconomics experts see an acceleration of the US–China rivalry as “inevitable” given the tensions manifested openly in the last months of 2022 and early 2023.  In a series of interviews with BBC News and Asharq News, Nicolas Firzli, director, EU ASEAN Centre, argued that "Cold War 2 with China [was] part of the Biden Doctrine, and the only remaining point of convergence between Biden and a Republic dominated Congress [...] January 2023 is the moment when things crystalized irreversibly".

Japan

In their first telephone call on January 27, 2021, Biden and Japanese Prime Minister Yoshihide Suga reaffirmed the U.S.'s commitment to the U.S.-Japan security alliance, including the "unwavering" American commitment to defending Japan under the U.S.-Japan Mutual Defense Treaty, including defense of the Senkaku Islands (which are administered by Japan, but claimed by China). Suga was the first foreign leader to meet with Biden in person when he visited Washington, D.C. on April 16, 2021.

North Korea

An early Biden administration effort to open a line of communication with North Korea was rebuffed. Following the launch of two missiles by North Korea in March 2021, the Biden administration questioned if they should impose sanctions or return to the summit-style diplomacy of the Trump administration.

South Korea

In their first telephone call on February 3, 2021, Biden and South Korean President Moon Jae-in agreed to enhance regional cooperation between Japan, the U.S., and South Korea on key issues, including issues on North Korea and China, and on the importance of improving strained Japan–South Korea relations. In March 2021, the U.S. and South Korea reached a military cost-sharing agreement, with South Korea increasing its annual payments to the U.S. by $1 billion (or about 13%). The U.S.-South Korea agreement resolved a deadlock inherited from the Trump administration. The U.S. also announced U.S.-South Korean joint military exercises (which Trump had scaled back and questioned the need for). The Biden administration affirmed the U.S.'s "unshakable" security commitment to South Korea under the Mutual Defense Treaty, to the readiness of U.S. forces in Korea, and to "reinvigorating and modernizing our democratic alliances around the world." Moon was the second foreign leader to meet with Biden in person when he visited Washington, D.C. on May 21, 2021.

Oceania

Australia 

On September 15, 2021, Biden held a meeting about AUKUS with British Prime Minister Boris Johnson and Australian Prime Minister Scott Morrison to announce that the U.S. will share their nuclear submarine technology with Australia as part of a nuclear propulsion and defense partnership with the country and the U.K. This is the first time since 1958, when then-President Dwight D. Eisenhower gave the technology to Great Britain, that America shared their nuclear submarine technology to the British. Biden stated that the deal was a way to "address both the current strategic environment in the (Indo-Pacific) region and how it may evolve".

South Asia

India

In their first telephone call on February 8, 2021, Biden and Indian Prime Minister Narendra Modi  committed to close cooperation on the COVID-19 pandemic, climate change, and promoting a "free and open Indo-Pacific region" and agreed that the "rule of law and the democratic process must be upheld" in India's regional neighbor Burma, in which the military seized power in a coup. Addressing regional security issues posed by China, Biden and Modi expressed "support for freedom of navigation, territorial integrity, and a stronger regional architecture through the Quad" (the U.S., India, Japan, and Australia).  Biden made no direct mention of the ongoing farmers' protests, but noted that a "shared commitment to democratic values" serves as the bedrock for the India–U.S. relationship. Modi stated after the call that both he and Biden are "committed to a rules-based international order" and "look forward to consolidating our strategic partnership."

Pakistan

Relations with Pakistan had been frosty, with Wendy Sherman making it clear that the administration will not currently build further bilateral relations as it has with India. Pakistani Prime Minister Imran Khan was reportedly "angry" for not having received a phone call from Biden yet, as of October 2021. Pakistan-India relations, and the situation in Afghanistan, played big parts in this - after Taliban militants took control of Kabul two months prior, Khan described it as “breaking the chains of slavery”. By the end of the year, Imran Khan was reportedly the "only major world leader" with whom Biden had not spoken with on the phone.

When Khan was facing a no-confidence motion in parliament, he blamed the United States for seeking to oust him, calling it part of an "international conspiracy". The United States denied these claims. Khan lost the no-confidence vote on April 9, 2022 and Shehbaz Sharif took his place as Prime Minister of Pakistan.

Afghanistan

After Biden took office, his administration began a broad review of the U.S.'s policy in Afghanistan, where 2,500 U.S. troops were stationed at the beginning of Biden's term.

In early February 2021, shortly after Biden took office, the bipartisan Afghanistan Study Group, a panel established by Congress in 2019, issued its report, recommended that the administration slow the further withdrawal of U.S. troops in Afghanistan, keeping U.S. troops after a May 1 deadline set by the February 2020 U.S.-Taliban Doha agreement reached under the Trump administration. The Study Group, led by former general Joseph Dunford and former U.S. Senator Kelly Ayotte, warned against a complete U.S. military withdrawal because the Taliban had not fully complied with their obligations under the agreement and because the panel viewed a quick withdrawal of remaining U.S. forces as a risk factor for renewed Afghan civil war, terrorist threats, and insurgency; the panel recommended that U.S. forces be further reduced as security conditions in the country improve.

Biden's Secretary of State Antony Blinken discussed the U.S. policy review with Afghan President Ashraf Ghani in February 2021, saying that the U.S. was committed to "a just and durable political settlement and permanent and comprehensive ceasefire" and would continue to consult "with Afghan leaders, NATO allies and international partners" on the future of the February 2020 deal. Later that month, in an unusually blunt letter from Blinken to Ghani, the U.S. expressed frustration with the stalled Afghan negotiations, in which Ghani was frequently intransigent and resisted the formation of an interim Afghan government that would advance the peace process but also probably end his presidency. The U.S. proposed a UN-led peace conference, and urged Ghani to participate "to move matters more fundamentally and quickly toward a settlement and a permanent and comprehensive cease-fire."

On April 13, 2021, the White House announced that the remaining 2,500 troops in Afghanistan would withdraw by September 11, 2021. The U.S. government commented that it would continue to support the Afghan government in regards of a possible Taliban military victory. The deadline was extended from that of May 1, 2021 previously announced by the Trump administration.

By early July 2021, most of the American troops in Afghanistan were withdrawn. Biden addressed the withdrawal, stating that: "The likelihood there's going to be the Taliban overrunning everything and owning the whole country is highly unlikely." However, on August 15, amid an offensive by the Taliban, the Afghan government collapsed and Afghan President Ashraf Ghani fled the country, leaving the Taliban in full control of Afghanistan.

During the initial siege of Kabul and the subsequent collapse of the Afghan government, Biden was vacationing at Camp David. Facing mounting criticism for the administration's handling of the event, Biden returned to the White House on August 16 where he delivered an address to the American people defending his decision to withdraw U.S. forces from the country. In his remarks, Biden blamed the Afghan National Army for failing to adequately defend against the Taliban saying, "American troops cannot and should not be fighting in a war and dying in a war that Afghan forces are not willing to fight for themselves."

The events in Afghanistan were one of the causes for Biden's approval rating declining in July and August 2021.

Many commentators have drawn comparisons between the withdraw and evacuation of U.S. forces in Afghanistan with the fall of Saigon at the end of the Vietnam War.

On July 31, 2022, Al-Qaida leader Ayman al-Zawahiri was killed in Kabul by an American drone strike approved by Biden.

Southeast Asia

ASEAN

On October 27, 2021, Joe Biden attended a virtual summit with ASEAN (East Asia Summit) which was last attended by a U.S. President in 2017. Biden urged "shared vision for a region where every country can compete and succeed on a level playing field." The 9 of 10 attending ASEAN members were Brunei, Cambodia, Indonesia, Laos, Malaysia, the Philippines, Singapore, Thailand and Vietnam. Myanmar's military government skipped the summit amid controversies with Brunei, current chair of the summit, and Cambodia. Biden's comments on the summit focused on democracy in the region and the international rules-based order. The National Security Council's East Asia director, Edgard Kagan, distinguished the aims of the Quad as not intended to be "an Asian NATO" and exists alongside the existing ASEAN. Additionally, the White House planned to fund $102 million towards climate, health, economic and education programs to advance strategic partnership with ASEAN.

Myanmar

Biden condemned the 2021 coup d'état in Myanmar and called upon the military to release State Counsellor Aung San Suu Kyi and the other officials whom they had detained. He stated that the "United States opposes any attempt to alter the outcome of recent elections or impede Myanmar's democratic transition." Biden called upon the military to "relinquish power it seized and demonstrate respect for the will of the people of Burma" and imposed new U.S. sanctions against the military coup plotters (some of whom were already under sanctions for atrocities against the Rohingya minority), including freezing $1 billion in assets.

Sub-Saharan Africa

Eritrea and Ethiopia

On January 27, the Department of State demanded that Eritrea withdraw from the Tigray War in Ethiopia.

U.S. Agency for International Development (USAID) Administrator Samantha Power, an appointee of President Biden, is scheduled to meet with Ethiopian officials in early August 2021 with the goal of preventing war-induced famine in Tigray. Power has called for "unimpeded humanitarian access to prevent famine...and meet urgent needs." Ethiopia accuses Tigray rebel forces (the TPLF and TDF) of blocking aid access; Tigray forces blame the Ethiopian federal government.

Liberia

On January 20, 2021, his first day in office, Biden sent a memorandum to the U.S. State Department reinstating Deferred Enforced Departure (DED) to Liberians.

Somalia

Although most U.S. troops were withdrawn from Somalia in early January 2021, an undisclosed number of U.S. troops participated in a training program against Al-Shabaab jihadists on January 31.

On July 20, 2021, the U.S. Air Force carried out the first airstrike against position of the al-Shabaab group under the Biden administration. The airstrike took place in the city of Galkayo, Somalia.

Sudan

USAID Administrator Samantha Power arrived in Sudan on July 31, 2021 to meet with senior transition officials. Sudan has been ruled by military and civilian leaders ever since the deposition of longtime Sudanese leader Omar al-Bashir in a military coup amid popular protests. Power will meet chairman of the transitional military-civilian Sovereignty Council Gen. Abdel Fattah al-Burhan and Prime Minister Abdalla Hamdok at Khartoum, the Sudanese capital.

Power described Sudan as "an inspiring example to the world that no leader is ever permanently immune from the will of their people;" she is expected to strengthen U.S. ties with the pro-Western transitional government and leverage USAID's resources to support Sudan's transition to a civilian democracy.

Multilateral organizations and policy

Consistent with his campaign pledges, Biden brought the U.S. back into several multilateral organizations and agreements.

Human rights
In early February 2021, soon after taking office, the Biden returned the United States to the United Nations Human Rights Council (which the Trump administration withdrew from in 2018) and directed the State Department "to re-engage immediately and robustly" with the council; Blinken, Biden's secretary of state, said that "The best way to improve the Council, so it can achieve its potential, is through robust and principled U.S. leadership."

Biden also rescinded the Mexico City Policy. The policy, first adopted under Reagan, has been alternately imposed under Republican administrations and rescinded under Democratic ones, and was extended in scope under Trump. Biden's repeal of the rule was welcomed by, among other, Doctors Without Borders and Amnesty International. Biden also withdrew the U.S. from the Geneva Consensus Declaration, an anti-abortion declaration that the U.S. had joined under Trump, and restored funding to the UN Population Fund.

COVID-19 pandemic response and global health
Biden signed an executive order on his first day in office, halting the U.S. withdrawal from the World Health Organization that Trump had ordered (but which had not yet taken effect). Biden also appointed Dr. Anthony Fauci, the U.S. government's chief infectious disease scientist, as the head of the delegation to the WHO.  The U.S. has been the largest financial contributor to the WHO, providing roughly one-fifth of its annual budget. Fauci stated the US would meet its financial obligations of $400–$500 million/year, and rejoin the COVAX global framework for vaccinating people in low to middle-income countries which had been stalled by lack of funding.

Biden renewed COVID-19-related travel bans barring non-U.S. nationals from several parts of the world, including the Schengen Area, the Ireland, the United Kingdom, and Brazil, from entering the U.S. These bans had initially been imposed by Trump, but before leaving office Trump had ordered that the bans expire on January 26, 2021.  The day before the travel bans were set to expire, Biden extended them and also added South Africa to the list of affected countries. The bans on entry by mainland Chinese and Iranian nationals were not scheduled to expire by Trump, and they remain in place.

The G7 

On February 19, 2021, the Group of Seven met virtually in a call convened by the U.K.'s Boris Johnson. Joe Biden spoke for fifteen minutes and declared "America is Back" with an end to Trump's "America First" Policy. Biden stressed the importance of the rise of China especially in the areas of cybersecurity and technology.

Biden attended the 47th G7 Summit in June 2021 alongside the U.K.'s Boris Johnson, Canada's Justin Trudeau, Japan's Yoshihide Suga, France's Emmanuel Macron, Germany's Angela Merkel, Italy's Mario Draghi and the EU represented by Ursula von der Leyen and Charles Michel. While at the G7 reception on June 11, Biden also met with Queen Elizabeth II before their scheduled meeting at Windsor Castle on June 13. At the G7 Summit talks, the leaders discussed the pandemic, environmental action, and how to challenge the rise of China on the world stage.

Environment and energy 

In January 2021, Biden stated that addressing climate change is "an essential element of U.S. foreign policy and national security."

In February 2021, President Biden signed an executive order for the U.S. to rejoin the Paris Accords, a 2015 agreement addressing climate change and emissions targets. In November 2021, Biden attended COP26 in Glasgow, stating that "we only have a brief window before us to raise our ambitions" to switch to renewable energy sources.

In November 2021, the U.S. coordinated with China, India, Japan, the U.K., and South Korea to release oil from strategic petroleum reserves to lower prices.

In December 2021, the Biden administration halted federal funding to new fossil fuel projects overseas.

Criticism and Praise 
The Biden team announced on arrival that "America is back", and most American experts heralded a return to "seriousness" after the chaos of the previous administrations foreign policy.  Now some admit that his policy is "a mess" that has "failed to match ends and means".

It "underestimated the seriousness of the threat to the American led world system, and misunderstood its causes".  Contrary to Biden's stated goals, "Russia isn't parked, Iran isn't pacified, and both are coordinating policies with China", which is increasingly aggressive.  The "wishful thinking" and "strategic incompetence" is thought to be not Biden's alone, but a "generational failure of the bipartisan foreign policy establishment.

In a Mid-term "report card" was published by 20 "experts",

See also 
 Second Cold War
 List of international presidential trips made by Joe Biden
 List of international trips made by Antony Blinken as United States Secretary of State

References

Further reading

 "Biden’s Midterm Report Card: We asked 20 experts to grade the administration’s foreign policy after two years in office." Foreign Policy (January 19, 2023) online
 "The Biden Progress Report: We asked 25 experts to grade the new team's start on foreign policy" Foreign Policy 00157228, (Spring 2021), Issue 240 online
 Wayne, Stephen J. The Biden Presidency: Politics, Policy, and Polarization (2023), first 18 months; see chapter 5 excerpt
 Whipple, Chris. The Fight of His Life: Inside Joe Biden's White House (Scribner, 2023) passim excerpt comprehensive history of first two years.

Presidency of Joe Biden
History of the foreign relations of the United States
Biden, Joe
Biden, Joe administration
Biden, Joe
Policies of Joe Biden
Articles containing video clips